Bring the War Home: The White Power Movement and Paramilitary America is a book written by Kathleen Belew.

Background 
Kathleen Belew is a history professor at the University of Chicago. Belew argues in the book that the modern white power movement emerged from the loss of the Vietnam War. The book discusses the Oklahoma City bombing, Ruby Ridge, and the Waco siege. The book also discusses the Greensboro massacre. Belew points out that it was during the conservative presidency of Ronald Reagan that the white power movement was gaining followers. The book discusses Louis Beam as one of the earliest leaders and also discusses the concept of a leaderless resistance. The book rejects the idea that white supremacist violence is only done by lone wolves. The book was written before the Unite the Right rally. However, the book provides a history of the movements that lead to the rally. The book discusses William Luther Pierce and The Turner Diaries. Chapter seven discusses the involvement of women in white supremacist groups like the Aryan Nations. The book also discusses the history of the Ku Klux Klan.

Reception 
Anna J. Clutterbuck-Cook wrote in Library Journal that "This necessary work reminds readers that white violence—on behalf of, and against, the state—has a long and deep history." Patrick Blanchfield wrote in The Nation that the book is "Meticulously researched and powerfully argued." Amy Cooter criticized the book in Reason for characterizing the militia movement as an outgrowth of the white power movement. The book was included in The Guardian's list of the best books of 2018.

References 

2018 non-fiction books
English-language books
Racism in the United States
Books about race and ethnicity
Harvard University Press books